Aaliyah Powell (born 25 October 2002) is a British taekwondo practitioner. Powell fought initially at Bantamweight before moving up to Lightweight and has won World Championship bronze at both weights.

She won a bronze medal in bantamweight at the 2019 World Taekwondo Championships, after being defeated by Tatiana Kudashova in the semifinal. She repeated the feat in the 2022 World Taekwondo Championships., falling in the semi-final to eventual gold medalist Sarah Chaari.

References

External links

2002 births
Living people
British female taekwondo practitioners
Taekwondo practitioners at the 2018 Summer Youth Olympics
Place of birth missing (living people)
World Taekwondo Championships medalists
21st-century British women